Esperanto periodicals have been an important element of the Esperanto movement since its beginning because it was one of the only practical ways the language could be used between conferences. The first Esperanto periodical was La Esperantisto, published from 1889 to 1895, and the second was Lingvo Internacia, published from 1895 to 1914. Hundreds of magazines have been published in Esperanto since then. This is an incomplete list.

Current

 Ateismo (English: Atheism), atheist publication
 Aŭroro (Aurora), a Czech Republic-based publication for the blind, written in Esperanto Braille
 Aveno (Oat)
 Beletra Almanako (Belles-Lettres Almanac), a three-times-a-year periodical of Esperanto belles-lettres
 Dia Regno (God's Kingdom), Protestant publication
 Dio Benu (God Bless), Catholic publication
 Esperanto, a monthly publication of the Universal Esperanto Association
 Esperantologio (Esperantology)
 Espero Katolika (Catholic Hope), a Catholic publication
 Etnismo
 Eventoj (Events)
 Femina
 Fenestro (Window)
 Fonto (Source), a monthly magazine about literature
 La Gazeto (The Magazine)
 Heroldo de Esperanto, a magazine published every three weeks about the Esperanto movement
 Homarane
 Hungara Fervojista Mondo
 Internacia Pedagogia Revuo
 Juna Amiko (Young Friend)
 La Juna Penso (The Young Thought)
 Kajeroj el la Sudo
 La KancerKliniko (The CancerClinic)
 La Karavelo
 Komencanto (Beginner)
 Kontakto (Contact), a monthly publication for young people published by TEJO, the World Esperanto Youth Organization
 Laŭte!
Libera Folio, an online Esperanto magazine
 Literatura Foiro, a magazine about culture, bi-monthly published by the Esperanto PEN center, La Chaux-de-Fonds
 Medicina Heroldo
 Medicina Internacia Revuo
 Merkato
 Monato (Month), a monthly publication similar to Time or Newsweek, but with all articles written by people from the place which the article is about
 Le Monde diplomatique en Esperanto (The Diplomatic World in Esperanto)
 Naturista Vivo (Naturist Life)
 Penseo
 Rok-Gazet''', a magazine about the Esperanto music (especially rock music) scene
 La Skolta Mondo (The Scout World)
 Scienca Revuo (Science Review) (though the latest issue is dated 2015)
 Scienco kaj Kulturo (Science and Culture)
 Semajno de enigmoj, an online monthly magazine of crosswords and puzzles in Esperanto
 Sennacieca Revuo (Anational Review)
 Sennaciulo (Anationalist)
 TEJO Tutmonde (TEJO Worldwide)
 Teleskopo (Telescope)
 ZajnRegional

 Andaj Ondoj, Colombian publication
 Armena Esperantisto, Armenian publication, published by Armena Organiz-Komitato Esperantista and edited by G. Sevak, first published in 1958
 Bosnia lilio, Gazeto de Esperanto Ligo de Bosnio kaj Hercegovino, is publication by Esperanto League of Bosnia and Herzegovina since 1997.
 Brazila Esperantisto, Brazilian publication founded in 1907
 La Brita Esperantisto, British publication
 El Popola Ĉinio, Chinese publication
 L'Esperanto, Italian publication
 Esperanto en Afriko, African publication
 Esperanto en Azio, Asian publication
 Esperanto en Skotlando, Scottish publication
 Esperanto sub la Suda Kruco, publication of the Australian Esperanto Association and New Zealand Esperanto Association
 La Espero el Koreio, Korean publication
 Fenikso, Dutch publication
 Irana Esperantisto, independent Iranian quarterly culture magazine
 Israela Esperantisto, Israeli publication founded in 1959
 La Lampiro, São Paulo-based publication
 Lumo, Canadian publication
 Momenton!, Brazilian youth publication
 Le Monde de l'Espéranto, French publication
 Ni ĉiuj, Mexican publication
 Nova Irlanda Esperantisto, Irish publication
 La Ondo de Esperanto, an illustrated Kaliningrad-based publication
 La Revuo Orienta, Japanese publication
 Usona Esperantisto, a bi-monthly publication of Esperanto-USA

HistoricalAmerika Esperantisto (American Esperantist)
 Belga Esperantisto (Belgian Esperantist), Belgian magazine published from 1908 to 1961
 Bohema Revuo Esperantista (Bohemian Esperantist Review), Bohemian periodical published from 1907 to 1914
 Der Esperantist (The Esperantist)
 La Esperantisto (The Esperantist), the first Esperanto periodical, published from 1889 to 1895
 L' Espérantiste (The Esperantist), early French publication
 Germana Esperantisto (German Esperantist)
 Germana Esperanto-Gazeto (German Esperanto Magazine), published from 1908 to 1912
 Lingvo Internacia (International Language), published from 1895 to 1914
 Literatura Mondo (Literary World), published from 1922 to 1949
 La Migranto (The Migrant)
 La Movado (The Movement), French publication founded in 1909
 PACO La Revuo (The Review), published from 1906 to 1914, featuring many of the original publications of Zamenhof's translations
 Ruĝa Esperantisto (Red Esperantist), published in 1922 by Vladimir Varankin
 Sonorilo (Bell''), Belgian magazine published from 1962 to 1974

See also
 Esperanto literature

References

 
Esperanto
Periodicals